Marie-Louise Gay (born June 17, 1952) is a Canadian children's writer and illustrator.  She has received numerous awards for her written and illustrated works in both French and English, including the 2005 Vicky Metcalf Award, multiple Governor General's Awards, and multiple Janet Savage Blachford Prizes, among others.

Biography 
Gay was born in Quebec City and lived in Montreal and Vancouver as a child.  Gay lives in Montreal.

Gay co-wrote two longer books with her husband, Montreal novelist and translator David Homel, which included her black-and-white illustrations: Travels With My Family (2006) and On the Road Again! (2008). At the time, she said, "For the last twenty-five years, I have mainly been writing, illustrating and creating only for children."

Awards and honours

In 2013, Canada Post released a series of stamps featuring Gay's character Stella.

Publications

Stella and Sam series

Gay's  Stella and Sam books have been published in more than twelve languages. They spawned a 52-episode cartoon series in 2013 that aired on Sprout and Family Junior.

Stella series
Stella, Star of the Sea (1999)
Stella, Queen of the Snow (2001)
Stella, Fairy of the Forest (2002)
Stella, Princess of the Sky (2004)
When Stella Was Very, Very, Small (2009)
Read Me A Story, Stella (2013)

Sam series
Sam is Stella's younger brother
Good Morning, Sam (2003)
Good Night, Sam (2003)
What Are You Doing, Sam? (2006)

Travels with My Family series
The Travels with My Family series was co-written with David Homel.
Travels With My Family (Groundwood, 2006)
On the Road Again! (Groundwood, 2008)
Summer in the City (Groundwood, 2012)
The Traveling Circus (Groundwood, 2015)
Travels in Cuba (Groundwood, 2021)

Standalone books authored 

 Lizzy's Lion (1984)
 The Garden: Little Big Books (1985)
 Moonbeam On A Cat's Ear (1986)
 Rainy Day Magic (1987)
 Angel and the Polar Bear (1988)
 Fat Charlie's Circus (1989)
 Willy Nilly (1990)
 Mademoiselle Moon (1992)
 Rabbit Blue (1993)
 Midnight Mimi (1994)
 Qui a peur de Loulou? (Who's afraid of Loulou?) (Montreal: VLB Editeur, 1994), 111pp, "Theatre for children"
 The Three Little Pigs (Canadian Fairy Tales Series) (1994)
 Rumplestiltskin (1997)
 Sur Mon Ile (1999)
 Caramba (2006)
 Roslyn Rutabaga and the Biggest Hole on Earth! (2010)
 Caramba and Henry (2011)
 Any Questions (2014)
 Short Stories for Little Monsters (2017)
 The Three Brothers (2020)

Books illustrated only 

The Last Piece (1993)
When Vegetables Go Bad! (1993)
The Fabulous Song (1996)
Dreams Are More Real Than Bathtubs (1999)
Yuck, a Love Story (2000)
Didi and Daddy on the Promenade (2001)
Houndsley and Catina (2006)
Maddie series; Sophie series (1993–2003)

References

External links 

  Archives of Marie-Louise Gay (Fonds Marie-Louise Gay, R11738) are held at Library and Archives Canada
 
 Official website

1952 births
Living people
Anglophone Quebec people 
Artists from Quebec City
Canadian children's book illustrators
Canadian children's writers in French
Governor General's Award-winning children's illustrators
Canadian women artists
Canadian women children's writers
Writers from Quebec City
20th-century Canadian women writers
21st-century Canadian women writers